Brandt's guiara (Euryzygomatomys guiara) is a Brazilian spiny rat species. It was formerly considered conspecific with E. spinosus.

References

Euryzygomatomys
Mammals described in 1835